Read Hall and Park is a manor house with ornamental grounds of about  in Whalley Road, Read, a few miles west of Padiham, Lancashire, England.

The current hall dates from the early 19th century and is a grade II* listed building. The landscaped grounds date from around the same time and feature a waterfall, two lakes and woodland. The hall and park are not open to the public.

History
The original building on the site was a three-storey building built round three sides of a courtyard by Roger Nowell, who acquired the estate in the 16th century after the Dissolution of Whalley Abbey. Alexander Nowell was an English theologian who was born in Read Hall in the Elizabethan age who was also in popular story the inventor of bottled beer on a fishing expedidition. Izaak Walton describes the story in the "Complete Angler". A later Roger Nowell (1582–1623) was Sheriff of Lancashire in 1610 and the magistrate at the time of the Lancashire Witches in 1612 who sent them to Lancaster for trial and eventual execution.  The estate passed to his grandson, Roger (1605–1695), who raised an army during the Civil War at his own expense to help defend Lathom House for the Royalists. During the Civil War a skirmish in 1643 known as the Battle of Read Bridge in the vicinity of the hall ended in a decisive victory for the Parliamentarian forces. After several more generations of Nowells the house was eventually sold on the death of Alexander Nowell in 1772. His widow returned to London with their daughter.

The current hall was built between 1818 and 1825 for Richard Fort, a wealthy partner in a Manchester Calico textile printing firm; when Richard died in 1829, the estate passed to his son John Fort, later the MP for Clitheroe. It was designed by the architect George Webster of Kendal when he was only 21. (Webster also built Underley Hall, Westmorland between 1825 and 1828 for Alexander Nowell). John Fort died in 1842 and was succeeded by his son Richard who was High Sheriff of Lancashire for 1854 and M.P. for Clitheroe from 1865 to 1868.

The rest of the park includes Home Farm and Lodge in Whalley Road, both by Webster at the same time. Home Farm was built as a model farm, and converted into living accommodation in the 20th century.

Media gallery

See also
Grade II* listed buildings in Lancashire
Listed buildings in Read, Lancashire
List of works by George Webster

References

External links

Alexander Balloch Grosart, The spending of the money of Robert Nowell of Reade hall, Lancashire, brother of Dean Alexander Norwell. 1568-1580, 1877

Grade II* listed buildings in Lancashire
Grade II* listed houses
Country houses in Lancashire
Buildings and structures in Ribble Valley
George Webster buildings